Gerson Aldaír Chávez Suazo (born 31 January 2000) is a professional footballer who plays as a defensive midfielder for Honduran Liga Nacional club Real España

Career
Chávez graduated from the in 2017, making his debut for the club as a 77th-minute substitute during a 2–0 win over Juticalpa on 7 December 2017.

On 13 August 2021, Chávez moved on loan to USL Championship side LA Galaxy II. He made two appearances for the team before returning to Real España at the end of the season.

International career
Chávez has represented Honduras at under-17, under-20 and under-21 level, including at the 2017 FIFA U-17 World Cup in India 2017 and in the 2019 FIFA U-20 World Cup held in Poland 2019.

Honours
Real España
 Honduran Liga Nacional: Apertura 2017

References

External links
 

2000 births
Living people
Honduran footballers
Association football midfielders
Real C.D. España players
LA Galaxy II players
USL Championship players
Honduras youth international footballers
Honduran expatriate footballers
Expatriate soccer players in the United States
Honduran expatriate sportspeople in the United States
Honduras under-20 international footballers